Lori Hope Lefkovitz (born May 6, 1956), the Ruderman Professor of Jewish Studies, directs the Northeastern Humanities Center and the Jewish Studies Program at Northeastern University.  She is the founding director of Kolot: The Center for Jewish Women and Gender Studies, the first such center at a rabbinical seminary.

Biography
A graduate of Brandeis University, Lefkovitz received her M.A. and Ph.D. in English from Brown University and was a recipient of a Woodrow Wilson dissertation fellowship in women's studies, a Golda Meir post-doctoral fellowship at Hebrew University, a post-doctoral fellowship at the Institute of the Philadelphia Association for Psychoanalysis, and in 2004, a Fulbright Professorship at Hebrew University. She was previously an associate professor at Kenyon College.

Among the courses she teaches or has taught at RRC are: Literary Approaches to Bible; Bible and the Feminist Imagination; Writing for the Rabbinate; Gender and Judaism; Queering Jewish Studies; Jewish Literature.

Since Kolot's founding in 1996, Lefkovitz has convened a landmark conference, together with the Renfrew Center, on Food, Body Image & Judaism, which examined eating disorders; established the Rosh Hodesh: "It's a girl thing!" program, that has popularly been adopted across the country; and, together with Ma'yan, co-founded Ritualwell.org, a Web site for contemporary Jewish ritual now maintained exclusively by Kolot, with Lefkovitz its Executive Editor. Through a joint initiative, she established a program with Temple University awarding a certificate in Jewish Women's Studies.

Lefkovitz serves on editorial and professional boards and lectures widely to academic and Jewish audiences. She is married to Rabbi Leonard Gordon, spiritual leader of Bnai Tikvah, in Canton MA, with whom she has two daughters.

Publications

Widely published in the fields of literature, critical theory, and Jewish Women's Studies, her articles, book chapters, and reviews have appeared in Nashim; Narrative; The Women's Passover Companion; Lilith; Sh'ma Magazine; The Reconstructionist; Hebrew University Studies in Literature and the Arts; Gender and Judaism; Lifecycles; Kerem; The Kenyon Review; A Mensch Among Men; Sister to Sister; and Contemporary Critical Theory.

The Character of Beauty in the Victorian Novel (UMI Research Press, 1987)
Editor, Textual Bodies: Changing Boundaries of Literary Representation (SUNY Press, 1997)
Co-editor with Julia Epstein, Shaping Losses: Cultural Memory and the Holocaust (University of Illinois Press, 2001).
Author: ''In Scripture: The First Stories of Jewish Sexual Identities (Rowman and Littlefield, 2010)

Sources

External links
 Reconstructionist Rabbinical College 
 Kolot: Center for Jewish Women and Gender Studies
 Ritualwell

1956 births
Living people
Brandeis University alumni
Brown University alumni
Jewish American writers
Jewish feminists
American feminists
Kenyon College faculty